= Verbandsgemeinde =

Administrative unit in Germany

A Verbandsgemeinde (German pronunciation: [fɛɐ̯ˈbantsɡəˌmaɪndə]; plural Verbandsgemeinden [fɛɐ̯ˈbantsɡəˌmaɪndn̩]) is a low-level administrative unit in the German federal states of Brandenburg, Rhineland-Palatinate and Saxony-Anhalt. A Verbandsgemeinde is typically composed of a small group of municipalities.

== Rhineland-Palatinate ==
The state of Rhineland-Palatinate is divided into 163 Verbandsgemeinden, which are municipal associations grouped within the 24 districts of the state and subdivided into 2,257 Ortsgemeinden (singular Ortsgemeinde [ˈɔʁtsɡəˌmaɪndə]) which comprise single settlements.

Most of the Verbandsgemeinden were established in 1969. Formerly the name for an administrative unit was Amt. Most of the functions of municipal government for several municipalities are consolidated and administered centrally from a larger or more central town or municipality among the group, while the individual municipalities (Ortsgemeinden) still maintain a limited degree of local autonomy.

== Saxony-Anhalt ==
The 11 districts of Saxony-Anhalt are divided into Verwaltungsgemeinschaften and, since 1 July 2009 also Verbandsgemeinden. Since the January 2010 government reform, there are 18 Verbandsgemeinden in Saxony-Anhalt.

== See also ==
Other German states have similar administrative units:

- Amt
- Samtgemeinde
- Verwaltungsgemeinschaft
